Piano Quintet No. 1 may refer to:

 Piano Quintet No. 1 (Bloch)
 Piano Quintet No. 1 (Dvořák)
 Piano Quintet No. 1 (Farrenc)
 Piano Quintet No. 1 (Fauré)